This is a list of episodes for the eighth season (1993–94) of the television series Married... with Children.

This season introduces many of Al's friends, including Aaron, Bob Rooney and Officer Dan (though Officer Dan was not a character in the earlier seasons, the actor who played him also appeared in "Rock 'n Roll Girl" as the sheriff who issued Al a ticket for an insulting bumper sticker, "Weenie Tot Lovers and Other Strangers" as the police officer who arrested Al, and "The Egg and I" as the FBI agent searching for Steve). Al, Jefferson, Bob Rooney, and Officer Dan (along with Griff and Ike, who are introduced in season 9) all become members of NO MA'AM in the episode where the men fight back against a talk show host (played by Jerry Springer) known as "The Masculine Feminist". This is also the season where Bud joins a fraternity. The closest explanation for Seven's mysterious disappearance 14 months before is in the episode "Ride Scare", where a closeup on a carton of milk reveals a picture of Seven with the word "Missing".  Al's plus-sized model friends simply look at it without comment before helping themselves.

Amanda Bearse missed three episodes this season.

Episodes

References

1993 American television seasons
1994 American television seasons
08